Keys Point is a projecting point of land at McDonald Beach,  northwest of Inclusion Hill in northwestern Ross Island, Antarctica. At the suggestion of P.R. Kyle, it was named by the Advisory Committee on Antarctic Names after John R. Keys, a New Zealand geochemist who worked for several seasons during the 1970s and 1980s under the auspices of the New Zealand Antarctic Programme and the United States Antarctic Research Program on investigations as to the origin of salts in the McMurdo Sound area, the Mount Erebus volcano, and the quantity, shapes, and sizes of icebergs in the Antarctic marine environment.

References

Headlands of Ross Island